Topole may refer to:

Topole, Pomeranian Voivodeship, a village in the administrative district of Gmina Chojnice, Chojnice County, Poland
Topole, Rogaška Slatina, a settlement in the Municipality of Rogaška Slatina in eastern Slovenia
Topole, Mengeš, a settlement in the Municipality of Mengeš in the Upper Carniola region of Slovenia

See also
Topolje (disambiguation)
Topol (disambiguation)